Od iyesi (Tatar: Ут Иясе or Ut İyäse; Chuvash: Вут Ийӗ; Sakha: Уот Иччи)  is the Turkic and Mongolian spirit or deity of fire. In Turkic languages, Od (or Ot) means fire, and iye is the familiar spirit of any natural asset, literally meaning "master" or "possessor." Od iyesi protects the fire.

Od Ana

Od Ana is the Turkic and Mongolian goddess of fire. She is also referred to as goddess of marriage. She is the female form of Od iyesi. The name Ot Ene means "fire mother" in the Altay language (od "fire"; ene "mother"). In Mongolian folklore, she is referred to as the "queen of fire." She was said to have been born at the beginning of the world, when the earth and sky separated and daughter of Yer Tanrı. 
 
Some equate her to Umai, the mother goddess of the Turkic Siberians, who is depicted as having sixty golden tresses that look like the rays of the sun. Umai is thought to have once been identical with Ot of the Mongols.

Tengri, the chief god, orders three fires to be burnt in the human soul, and Od Ana buries and puts out the three fires on Earth. Today, Turkish people call this "cemre," the fire that falls to Air, Earth and Water every year.

In Turkic languages

Tuvan: От Ава 
Uzbek: O't Ona or Otash Ona 
Tatar: Ут Әни or Ут Ана or Ut Ana
Azerbaijani: Od Ana
Kazakh: От Ана 
Chuvash: Вут Анне or Вут Абай 
Bashkir: Ут Апай 
Yakut: Уот Ий̃э 
Turkmen: Ot Ene or Ot Eje
Uyghur: ئوت ئانا
Turkish: Od Ana
Ottoman Turkish: اود آنا 
Kyrgyz: От Эне 
Altai: От Эне
Khakas: От Ине or От Иӌе 
Karachay-Balkar: От Ана
Gagauz: Od Ana

Its name in Hungarian culture is Tűz Anya and in Mongolian belief is Гал Ээж (Buryat: Гал Эхэ; Oirat: Һал Эк). These entities have many similarities, and each has the same meaning, "fire mother."

Od Ata

Od Ata is the Mongolian and Turkic / Altai god of fire. He is the male form of Od iyesi. Od Ede means 'Fire Father' in the Altay language (od "fire"; ede "father"). In Mongolian folklore he is referred to as the Od Khan "king of fire". Od Khan (or Odqan) is a fire spirit in the shamanistic traditions of Mongolia. He is usually described as a red coloured humanoid, riding a brown goat. His female counterpart is Yalun Eke (Yalın Eke), the 'fire mother' and son of Kayra.

In Turkic languages

Tuvan: От Ата 
Uzbek: O't Ota or Otash Ota 
Tatar: Ут Әти or Ут Ата or Ut Ata
Azerbaijani: Od Ata
Kazakh: От Ата 
Chuvash: Вут Атте or Вут Ашшӗ 
Bashkir: Ут Атай 
Yakut: Уот Аҕа 
Turkmen: Ot Ata 
Uyghur: ئوت ئاتا 
Turkish: Od Ata 
Kyrgyz: От Ата 
Altai: От Ада 
Khakas: От Аба  or От Ада
Karachay-Balkar: От Ата 
Gagauz: Od Ana

Its name in Hungarian culture is Tűz Atya or Tűz Apa and in Mongolian belief is Гал Эцэг (Buryat: Гал Эсэгэ; Oirat: Һал эцк). These entities have many similarities, and each has the same meaning, "fire father."

Similar creatures
 Ocak iyesi ("hearth spirit") is spirit of hearths. It is one kind of Od iyesi.
 Soba iyesi ("stove spirit") is a fire spirit as well.

References

External links 
 Fire Mother (Ateş Anası) 
 Od Ana 

Fire deities
Religion in Mongolia
İye
Fire goddesses
Fire gods